Vexillum mirabile, common name : miraculous mitre, is a species of small sea snail, marine gastropod mollusk in the family Costellariidae, the ribbed miters.

Description
The shell size varies between 33 mm and 66 mm

Distribution
This species is distributed in the Red Sea, in the Indian Ocean along the Mascarene Basin and Madagascar, in the Pacific Ocean along the Philippines and Thailand and the Tuamotus.

References

 Drivas, J. & M. Jay (1988). Coquillages de La Réunion et de l'île Maurice
 Turner H. 2001. Katalog der Familie Costellariidae Macdonald, 1860. Conchbooks. 1–100 page(s): 45

External links
 
  Liénard, Élizé. Catalogue de la faune malacologique de l'île Maurice et de ses dépendances comprenant les îles Seychelles, le groupe de Chagos composé de Diego-Garcia, Six-îles, Pèros-Banhos, Salomon, etc., l'île Rodrigues, l'île de Cargados ou Saint-Brandon. J. Tremblay, 1877.

mirabile
Gastropods described in 1853